Esra Battaloğlu is a Turkish geneticist researching the human genetics of inherited peripheral neuropathies. She is an assistant professor at Boğaziçi University.

Education 
Battaloğlu graduated from High School TED Ankara Koleji in 1982. She completed a B.S. in the department of biology at the Middle East Technical University in 1986. Battaloğlu earned an M.S. (1989) and Ph.D. (1992) in the department of biology at Boğaziçi University.

Career and research 
In September 1993, she joined the faculty at Boğaziçi University as an assistant professor in the department of molecular biology and genetics. She researches the human genetics of inherited peripheral neuropathies.

References

External links 

 

Living people
Year of birth missing (living people)
Place of birth missing (living people)
Turkish geneticists
Turkish women scientists
20th-century women scientists
21st-century women scientists
Women geneticists
20th-century births
Middle East Technical University alumni
Boğaziçi University alumni
Academic staff of Boğaziçi University